Wanka Quechua is a variety of the Quechua language, spoken in the southern part of Peruvian region of Junín by the Huancas.

Wanka Quechua belongs to Quechua I, like Ancash Quechua. It has about 300,000 speakers and three main dialects: Waylla Wanka in Huancayo and Chupaca provinces, Waycha Wanka in Concepción and Shawsha Wanka in Jauja. Rodolfo Cerrón Palomino, a native Wanka speaker, published the first Wanka grammar and dictionary in 1977.

References

Languages of Peru
Quechuan languages
Indigenous languages of the Andes